Progressive pseudorheumatoid disyplasia (PPD or PPAC) is a disorder of bone and cartilage that affects many joints. The disorder leads to stiff joints, short stature and widening of the ends of the finger and toe bones as well as other tubular bones.

Cause 
PPD is due to a mutation in the Wnt1-inducible signalling protein 3 (WISP3) gene, which encodes a signalling factor involved in cartilage homeostasis.

Symptoms 
Symptoms are present typically between ages three and six years.
 Abnormal walking pattern
 Weakness/fatigue
 Stiffness in the joints of the fingers and knees

Diagnosis

Treatment

Prognosis 
PPD has no severe effect on life span.

Epidemiology 
PPD is an extremely rare disease. In the United States the disease is estimated to affect less than 5,000 people and approximately 1 per million people in the United Kingdom however it is believed to be more common in Turkey and the Middle East.

References 

Rare diseases
Osteopathies